is an actress and former Japanese idol best recognized as the "Face of Nogizaka46". She was a first generation member of the girl group Nogizaka46 and AKB48's Team B,  also known as the former's eternal ace and original center, being appointed the position for an A-side six times in total for Nogizaka46's first five singles, "Guruguru Curtain", "Oide Shampoo", "Hashire! Bicycle", "Seifuku no Mannequin", and "Kimi no Na wa Kibō", as well as their 12th Single "Taiyō Nokku", which was the record highest at the time for the group, and is still the most for solo centers. Yasushi Akimoto originally made it to be so that Ikoma's graduation single "Synchronicity (song)" was for her as center, but she declined. 

She played the leading role of Naomi Nakashima in the film Corpse Party.

Biography

1995-2018: Early life and Nogizaka46 
Ikoma was born in Yurihonjō, Akita Prefecture on December 29, 1995. During elementary school, she was bullied, which made her not want to go to school, but she still did so that her mother wouldn't worry. Ikoma had been learning to dance since childhood, and became involved in the show business with the encouragement of her father who encouraged her to audition for Nogizaka46.  In 2011, she applied for the Nogizaka46 auditions along with 38,934 other girls. She became one of the 56 candidates who advanced to the final round. As of August, she was chosen to become one of the 36 1st Generation members.

For Nogizaka46's debut single, "Guruguru Curtain", Ikoma was chosen to be the center in the song's choreography. She once again solidified her position in their second single, titled "Oide Shampoo", and recorded a solo song, which was included as a B-side on the single. This would be Nogizaka46's system during the group's early period. The 4th Single "Seifuku no Mannequin" would become her signature song. On 24 February 2014, it was announced at the AKB48 Group Team Shuffle that she would join AKB48's Team B.

On 26 February 2015, it was revealed that Ikoma will star in a live-action film based on the Corpse Party series of video games. Exactly a month later, on 26 March, it was announced that she would leave AKB48. On Nogizaka46's 12th Single "Taiyō Nokku" released on 22 July 2015, Ikoma returned as the group's center from her concurrent position in AKB48, last holding position zero on their 5th Single "Kimi no Na wa Kibō" two years prior.

On 21 February 2016, it was announced that she became a model for Anna Sui in Asian regions. She published her first solo photo book, Kimi no Ashiato, on 24 February 2016. It sold 16,000 copies in its first week, and ranked 1st on the Oricon weekly photo book sales chart. On 29 March 2016, Ikoma participated in the ceremonial first pitch before a baseball match between The Fukuoka SoftBank Hawks and the Saitama Seibu Lions. She also appeared in SoftBank's advertising as the voice of "Giga-chan". In the same year, she reprised her lead role in the sequel to the Corpse Party film, Corpse Party: Book of Shadows. The film was released in Japan in July 2016. Ikoma also appeared in a musical adaptation of Kochira Katsushika-ku Kameari Kōen-mae Hashutsujo in September 2016.

On 31 January 2018, Ikoma announced her graduation from Nogizaka46 on the group's official blog. On 22 April, her graduation concert was held at the Nippon Budokan. Nogizaka46's 20th Single, "Synchronicity" was released on 25 April. It was the group's last single to feature Ikoma. After the revelation of her position at the middle of the second row caused a huge shock because the face of the group wasn't center for her own graduation as anticipated, amid reports, it was confirmed in her interview with Nikkan Sports that producer and songwriter Yasushi Akimoto expressed "Synchronicity" was for Ikoma to center, but she declined, for she didn't want the first single since winning the Grand Prix at the Japan Record Awards to be about her. Ikoma's graduation song and 1st Generation song, the B-side "Against" was the group's final song with her as their center, reuniting the front three with Erika Ikuta and Minami Hoshino for the first time since "Kimi no Na wa Kibō". She came up with the idea for the music video. On 6 May, Ikoma officially graduated from the group after an event at Makuhari Messe.

2018-present: Post-Nogizaka46 
Ikoma appeared in a musical adaptation of Mahō Sensei Negima! as Negi Springfield in July 2018.

She opened a YouTube channel in 2020 called "生駒里奈 'IKOMACHANNEL'". As of July 2021, it has 220,000 subscribers.

Discography

Singles with Nogizaka46

Albums with Nogizaka46

Singles with AKB48

Albums with AKB48

Other featured songs

Filmography

Television

Films

Theatre

Commercials

Bibliography

Photobooks
 NogizakaHa: Nogizaka46 First Shashinshū (2013,)
 Kikan Nogizaka vol.4 Saitō (26 December 2014, Tokyo News Service) 
 Kimi no Ashiato (24 February 2016, Gentosha)

Essay books
 Tatsu (立つ) (28 April 2018, Nikkei Business Publications)

References

External links 

 

Nogizaka46 members
AKB48 members
1995 births
Living people
People from Yurihonjō
Japanese idols
J-pop singers
Sony Music Entertainment Japan artists
People from Akita Prefecture
Actors from Akita Prefecture
Japanese film actresses
Japanese television actresses
Musicians from Akita Prefecture
21st-century Japanese women singers
21st-century Japanese singers
21st-century Japanese actresses